The Columbia Bar, also frequently called the Graveyard of the Pacific, is a system of bars and shoals at the mouth of the Columbia River spanning the U.S. states of Oregon and Washington. It is known as one of the most dangerous bar crossings in the world.

Description

The bar is where the river's current dissipates into the Pacific Ocean, often as large standing waves.  The waves are partially caused by the deposition of sediment as the river slows, as well as mixing with ocean waves.  The waves, wind, and current are hazardous for vessels of all sizes. The Columbia current varies from  westward, and therefore into the predominantly westerly winds and ocean swells, creating significant surface conditions.
Unlike other major rivers, the current is focused "like a fire hose" without the benefit of a river delta.
Conditions can change from calm to life-threatening in as little as five minutes due to changes of direction of wind and ocean swell.
Since 1792, approximately 2,000 large ships have sunk in and around the Columbia Bar, and because of the danger and the numerous shipwrecks the mouth of the Columbia River acquired a reputation worldwide as the graveyard of the Pacific.

The Clatsop Spit juts into the ocean on the south side of the river mouth, and on the north side is Peacock Spit, named after the USS Peacock which wrecked there in 1841.

In 1884, after decades of shipwrecks, the United States Corps of Engineers built the south jetty to keep the channel navigable. In 1914, the north jetty was added.

The nearby United States Coast Guard Station Cape Disappointment, Washington, is renowned for operating in some of the roughest sea conditions in the world, and is home to the National Motor Lifeboat School. It is the only school for rough weather and surf rescue operation in the US, and is respected internationally as a center of excellence for heavy boat operations.

Approximately 16 bar pilots, earning about $180,000 per year, guide ships across the bar, often boarding ships by helicopter.
They generally consider "the bar" to be the area between the north and south jetties and Sand Island (see detail of bathymetric map for locations of these). Over 700 people have drowned in the Columbia Bar and Bar Pilots are highly skilled and trained in navigating ships through the rough waters.

The Columbia Bar is part of a set of major marine coastal hazards along the Pacific Northwest coast, including Cape Flattery at the northwest tip of the Olympic Peninsula and Cape Scott, which is at the north tip of Vancouver Island. Historically, the region's mariner's nickname was the Graveyard of the Pacific, and it is studded with thousands of shipwrecks. The "Graveyard" also includes the rocky, rugged shoreline of the west coast of Vancouver Island, the shores of the Olympic Peninsula, and the Strait of Juan de Fuca.

Viewing 
The most accessible place to watch ships cross the bar is at the South Jetty viewing platform at Fort Stevens State Park located near Warrenton, Oregon. This is also the north end of the Oregon Coast Trail. A more dramatic view can be found by hiking the steep  trail to the Cape Disappointment Lighthouse at the Cape Disappointment State Park located in Ilwaco, Washington.

See also
 King & Winge (bar pilot boat from 1924 to 1958).
 U.S. lightship Columbia, historic navigational aid into the Columbia River.
 Rabboni, first regular steam tug to bring a ship across the Columbia bar.
 SS Iowa, wrecked on Columbia Bar in 1936.
 Rosecrans, wrecked on Columbia Bar in 1913.

References

External links
 "Rough Bar" photos at Columbia River Bar Pilots website
 Columbia River Bar Pilots  Video produced by Oregon Field Guide

Columbia River
Landforms of Pacific County, Washington
Landforms of Clatsop County, Oregon
Shoals of the United States